This is a list of the Oxford University Isis crews who have competed in The Reserve Boat Race, which started in 1965.

Rowers are listed left to right in boat position from bow to stroke. The number following the rower indicates the rower's weight in stones and pounds.

2010 onwards

{| class="wikitable" width="100%"
! bgcolor="#efefef" colspan=3 | 2010 onwards
|- bgcolor="#efefef"
!Year
!Wins
!Crew
|- 
|2010 ||  ||  W G Rueter, 14; M C Hafner, 11. 13½; A E L De Weck, 14. 9; D A W Bruce, 14; B E Grüter, 14. 6½; B J Le Feber, 13. 10; E P Newman, 13. 7½; A N R Dent, 13. 5½; Cox J Carlson, 8. 9
|-
|2011 || W ||  D G Harvey, 12. 5½; M Pointing, 13. 3; A E L De Weck, 14. 9½; B E K Snodin, 13. 2½; A K Woods, 12. 8½; D A Whiffin, 14. 3½; G R Blessley, 13. 4; T S Watson, 11. 5; Cox Z M De Toledo, 7. 11¾
|-
|2012 || W – Race Record ||  T Hilton, 11. 2; C W Fairweather, 14. 1; J J Bubb-Humfreys, 13. 10; B E K Snodin, 13. 3; J Dawson, 13. 12; G W Macleod, 13. 5; A J Webb, 15. 11; T S Watson, 11. 5; Cox K A Apfelbaum, 8. 7
|-
|2013 || W ||  I Mandale, 11. 11; N Hazell, 14. 9; A K Woods, 12. 2; W Zeng, 13. 1; J Dawson, 14. 2; B French, 13. 2; J Stephenson, 12. 2; T S Watson, 11. 3; Cox L Harvey, 8. 6
|-
|2014 || W ||  J Redos, 12. 13; A Bostrom, 13. 5; W Geffen, 12. 11; N Hazell, 14.11; J Fraser-Mackenzie, 13. 6; J Mountain 13. 8; I Mandale, 11. 4; C W Fairweather, 13. 8; Cox S Shawdon, 8. 5
|-
|2015 || W ||  J Abdulla; C Thurston; M Gerlak; J Mountain; D Grant; J Bugajski; I Mandale; J Tveit; S Collier
|-
|2016 || W ||  D Parr; R Stirling; W Geffen; C Thurston; J Dawson; B McSweeney; D Grant; T Commins; O Cleary
|-
|2017 || W ||  J White; A; W Cahill; A Harzheim; D Milovanovic; G Mckirdy; B Aldous; C Mertens; A Carbery
|-
|2018 ||  ||  J Olandi; A Wythe; C Wales; C Buchanan; N Elkington; B Bathurst; L Robinson; T Commins; A Carbery
|-
|2019 ||  ||  B Thomson; C Thurston; N Elkington; H Frigaard; J Bowesman-Jones; B Aldous; L Robinson; L von Malaise; D Brameier
|-
|2020 || No Race ||  L von Malaise; D Holod; J White; N Elkington; A Bebb; C Pearson; J Bowesman-Jones; L Robinson; T de Mendonca
|-
|2021 ||  ||  C Rimmer; B Thomson; A Warley; N Elkington; H Pearson; A Teece; C Buchanan; L Robinson; O Perry
|-
|2022 || W ||  P Denton; C Rimmer; J Forward; H Pearson; M Barakso; A Wambersie; T von Mueller; J Bowesman-Jones; L Corrigan

See also
List of Oxford University Boat Race crews
List of Cambridge University Boat Race crews

References
Isis Crew Lists – from 2000 to present
The Oxford and Cambridge Boat Race website – from 2002 to present, with biographies and weights
The Oxford and Cambridge Boat Race website - 2022 Isis crew

 Isis
History of rowing
Isis crews
Boat Race
Boat Race
England sport-related lists
Lists of rowers